Francisco Bográn Barahona (1852 – 7 December 1926) was acting President of Honduras from 5 October 1919 to 1 February 1920. He was the brother of previous president Luis Bográn. He was the President of National Congress of Honduras from 1919 to 1920.

References

External links

1852 births
1926 deaths
Presidents of Honduras
Presidents of the National Congress of Honduras
Foreign Ministers of Honduras
Liberal Party of Honduras politicians